Lahyani is a surname. Notable people with the surname include:

Firas Lahyani (born 1991), Tunisian basketball player
Mohamed Lahyani (born 1966), Swedish tennis umpire